(born 7 November 1978) is a Japanese rugby union player, he plays Number 8.

He played for Yamaha Jubilo, from 2001/02 to 2008/09. He plays currently for NTT Communications Shining Arcs.

He had 32 caps for Japan national rugby union team, from 2001 to 2008, without scoring. He played six games at the 2003 and 2007 World Cups.

Honours 
 32 caps for Japan national rugby union team
 Selections by year: 2 in 2001, 8 in 2003, 3 in 2004, 3 in 2005, 9 in 2006, 6 in 2007, 1 in 2008.
 Participation in the World Cup : 2003 (3 matches, 3 starts), 2003 (3 matches, 1 start).

Notes 

Japanese rugby union players
Rugby union number eights
1978 births
Living people
Japan international rugby union players
Ritsumeikan University alumni
Shizuoka Blue Revs players
Urayasu D-Rocks players
Japan international rugby sevens players